The Canoochee River (pronounced kuh-NOO-chee) is a  river in southeastern Georgia in the United States.  It is a tributary of the Ogeechee River, which flows to the Atlantic Ocean. In 1738 the Trustees of the colony mentioned the proposed house and ferry boat over the 'Cooanoochi River'.

Course

Name origin
"Canoochee" may be a name derived from the Muscogee language, meaning "little ground". The United States Board on Geographic Names settled on "Canoochee River" as the stream's preferred spelling in 1910.  According to the Geographic Names Information System, variant names have included:

See also
List of Georgia rivers

Sources

Columbia Gazetteer of North America entry
DeLorme (2003).  Georgia Atlas & Gazetteer.  Yarmouth, Maine: DeLorme.  .

Rivers of Georgia (U.S. state)
Rivers of Bryan County, Georgia
Rivers of Candler County, Georgia
Rivers of Emanuel County, Georgia
Rivers of Liberty County, Georgia
Rivers of Evans County, Georgia